Adair County High School may refer to:
Adair County High School (Kentucky), Columbia, Kentucky, US
Adair County R-II High School, Brashear, Missouri, US
Adair County R-I High School, Novinger, Missouri, US